October 27 - Eastern Orthodox liturgical calendar - October 29

All fixed commemorations below are observed on November 10 by Eastern Orthodox Churches on the Old Calendar.

For October 28th, Orthodox Churches on the Old Calendar commemorate the Saints listed on October 15.

Feasts
 The Protection of Our Most Holy Lady Theotokos and Ever-Virgin Mary, at the Blachernae church in Constantinople (911).  (see also: October 1 - traditional date)

Saints
 Martyrs Terence and Neonilla, of Syria, and their children (249):
 Sarbelus, Photus, Theodulus, Hierax, Nitus, Bele, and Eunice
 Great-martyr Paraskevi of Iconium (3rd century)
 Venerable Saints Firmilian, Bishop of Caesarea in Cappadocia (c. 269), and Malchion, priest of Antioch (late 3rd century)
 Hieromartyr Cyriacus, Chorepiscopus of Jerusalem, and his mother, Martyr Anna (both 363)  (see also: October 18)
 Venerable Diomedes the Young, of Cyprus, Wonderworker (c. 4th century)
 Saint Abramius of Ephesus, Bishop of Ephesus (6th century)
 Saint Febronia (632), daughter of Emperor Heraclius.
 Venerable Stephen of Mar Sabbas monastery in Palestine, hymnographer (807)
 Saint John the Chozebite, Bishop of Caesarea in Palestine (532) (See also: October 3 - Greek)
 Hieromartyr Neophytus, bishop of Urbnisi, Georgia (7th century)

Pre-Schism Western saints
 Martyrs Terence, Africanus, Maximus, Pompeius, and 36 others, at Carthage (250)  (see also: March 13, April 5, April 10)
 Martyrs Anastasia and Cyril, early martyrs in Rome (c. 253)  (see also: October 29 - East)
 Martyr Cyrilla, the daughter of St Tryphonia (c. 268)
 Martyr Fidelis of Como, an Italian soldier-saint, martyred in Lombardy under Maximian Herculeus (304)
 Saint Honoratus of Vercelli, Bishop of Vercelli (c. 415)
 Saint Ferrutius of Mainz, Germany.
 Saint Salvius (Saire), a hermit in France who lived at the place now called Saint-Saire after him (6th century)
 Saint Faro, Bishop of Meaux in France (626), he greatly encouraged monasticism, confessor (675)
 Saint Godwin of Stavelot, Abbot of the monastery of Stavelot-Malmédy in Belgium (c. 690)
 Saint Dorbheneus (Dorbhene), Abbot of Iona (713)
 Saint Anglinus, tenth Abbot of Stavelot-Malmédy near Liège in Belgium (c. 768)
 Saint Alberic, Abbot of Stavelot-Malmédy in Belgium (779)
 Saint Remigius of Lyon, Archbishop of Lyons in France (875)
 Saint Eadsin (Eadsige), thirty-third Archbishop of Canterbury, England, who Crowned King Edward the Confessor (1050)

Post-Schism Orthodox saints
 Saint Arsenius of Srem, Archbishop of Serbia (1266)
 Venerable Athanasius I, Patriarch of Constantinople (Mount Athos) (1340)  (see also: October 24)
 Saint Nestor (not the Chronicler) of the Kiev Caves (14th century)
 Righteous Virgin Parasceva of Pirimin on the Pinega River (Arkhangelsk) (16th century)
 Venerable Job of Pochayiv, Abbot and Wonderworker of Pochaev (1651)
 Saint Demetrius of Rostov, Metropolitan of Rostov (1709)
 New Martyrs Angelis, Manuel, George, and Nicholas, at Rethymno on Crete (1824)
 Repose of St. Theophilus, Fool-for-Christ, of Kiev (1853)
 Venerable Arsenios the Cappadocian (1924)  (See also: November 10 - Greek)

New martyrs and confessors
 New Hieromartyr John Vilensky, Priest of Yaroslavl-Rostov (1918)
 New Hieromartyr Michael Lektorsky, Archpriest of Kuban (1921)

Other commemorations
 Synaxis of the Shrine of Panagia Eleftherotria ("Our Lady of Deliverance") of Athens, Greece.
 Synaxis of the Church of Panagia Eleftherotria ("Our Lady of Deliverance") of Didymoteicho, Greece.
 Synaxis of the Icon of Panagia Ponolytrias of Serres, Greece.
 Repose of Elder Epiphanius (Theodoropoulos) of Athens (1989)

Icon gallery

Notes

References

Sources
 October 28/November 10. Orthodox Calendar (PRAVOSLAVIE.RU).
 November 10 / October 28. HOLY TRINITY RUSSIAN ORTHODOX CHURCH (A parish of the Patriarchate of Moscow).
 October 28. OCA - The Lives of the Saints.
 The Autonomous Orthodox Metropolia of Western Europe and the Americas (ROCOR). St. Hilarion Calendar of Saints for the year of our Lord 2004. St. Hilarion Press (Austin, TX). p. 80.
 October 28. Latin Saints of the Orthodox Patriarchate of Rome.
 The Roman Martyrology. Transl. by the Archbishop of Baltimore. Last Edition, According to the Copy Printed at Rome in 1914. Revised Edition, with the Imprimatur of His Eminence Cardinal Gibbons. Baltimore: John Murphy Company, 1916. p. 332.
 Rev. Richard Stanton. A Menology of England and Wales, or, Brief Memorials of the Ancient British and English Saints Arranged According to the Calendar, Together with the Martyrs of the 16th and 17th Centuries. London: Burns & Oates, 1892. pp. 516–517.
Greek Sources
 Great Synaxaristes:  28 ΟΚΤΩΒΡΙΟΥ. ΜΕΓΑΣ ΣΥΝΑΞΑΡΙΣΤΗΣ.
  Συναξαριστής. 28 Οκτωβρίου. ECCLESIA.GR. (H ΕΚΚΛΗΣΙΑ ΤΗΣ ΕΛΛΑΔΟΣ).
Russian Sources
  10 ноября (28 октября). Православная Энциклопедия под редакцией Патриарха Московского и всея Руси Кирилла (электронная версия). (Orthodox Encyclopedia - Pravenc.ru).
  28 октября (ст.ст.) 10 ноября 2013 (нов. ст.). Русская Православная Церковь Отдел внешних церковных связей. (DECR).

October in the Eastern Orthodox calendar